Ventnor Town Station can refer to one of two historical Railway Stations in Ventnor, Isle of Wight.
 Ventnor, opened September 1866, renamed 'Ventnor Town' 1923, name reverted to 'Ventnor' 1953, closed 1966.
 Ventnor West, opened June 1900 as Ventnor Town, renamed 'Ventnor West' 1923, closed 1952